Shortridge's rock mouse (Petromyscus shortridgei) is a species of rodent in the family Nesomyidae.
It is found in Angola and Namibia.
Its natural habitat is subtropical or tropical dry shrubland.

References

Petromyscus
Mammals described in 1926
Taxa named by Oldfield Thomas
Taxonomy articles created by Polbot